Al-Karāmah was a proposed planned city to be built on the border of the emirates of Abu Dhabi and Dubai. It was intended to be the permanent capital of the United Arab Emirates as stated in the Constitution of 1971. The proposed city was never built, and Abu Dhabi became the official capital of the UAE in 1996.

History
In 1968, the United Kingdom announced that it would end its protectorate over the Trucial States (the predecessors of the UAE), leading the rulers of the States to propose a "Federation of Arab Emirates" together with nearby Bahrain and Qatar, to be led by a Supreme Council composed of their nine rulers. Negotiations were dogged by security concerns as well as issues of representation.

On October 21, 1969, the sixth and final meeting of the Supreme Council agreed that Abu Dhabi, the largest (in land area) and wealthiest of the nine, should temporarily host the capital of the new countries, with a new capital to be built between Abu Dhabi and Dubai. However, this agreement was never ratified after the meeting broke up following a clumsy British intervention. Bahrain and Qatar eventually withdrew from the proposed federation.

On July 10, 1971, the Trucial States announced the formation of the United Arab Emirates, and the capital issue resurfaced.  The five small emirates counter-proposed building a new capital on the border of Dubai and Sharjah, arguing that the development funds would be better used to the benefit of the oil-poor Northern emirates but this was rejected by Dubai and Abu Dhabi.  Eventually, the previous compromise was agreed upon, and Article 9 of the final constitution stated:

The Constitution came into effect on December 2, 1971, with Abu Dhabi as the provisional capital, with a five year term. A quarter-century after the initial constitution, the Supreme Council of the UAE passed Constitutional Amendment Nr. 1 of May 1996, which specified that "Abu Dhabi City is the Capital of the Federation." and thus finally ended any prospect of Karama being constructed as the new capital of the United Arab Emirates.

Legacy
Even in the UAE, few today are aware of the planned capital. However, some references to Al Karama remain in the infrastructure of the United Arab Emirates; for example, telephone area code 01 (+971 1) remains reserved for the city.

References

Politics of the United Arab Emirates
History of the United Arab Emirates
Planned cities in the United Arab Emirates
Emirate of Abu Dhabi
Emirate of Dubai